Madrone is an American Alternative Rock band based in Roanoke, Virginia, formed on Frontman/Guitarist John "JD" Sutphin's birthday in February 2005. After several member changes, the line-up solidified as a power-trio featuring Joey Coleman on drums in 2005 and Blaine Davis on Bass Guitar and live Back-up Vocals in 2007. The group broke through the Billboard Mainstream Top 200 in summer 2010 with their single "Daybreak", written about a close friend who died from a heroin overdose. The song entered the chart at #82 and climbed for 8 weeks; peaking at #50. Madrone has been inactive since 2015 when the lead vocalist formed The Low Low Chariot. According to Madrone Facebook, they are on hiatus.

Members

Current 
John "J.D." Sutphin - Lead Vocals, Electric Guitar, Acoustic Guitar (Currently in Low Low Chariot) 
Joey Coleman - Drums and Percussion 
Blaine Davis - Bass Guitar, Back-up Vocals (live)
Matt McGhee - Guitar (left for family)

Discography

Albums 

 In Time (2008) Produced by Jake Dempsey at Red Room Studios in Roanoke, Virginia 
 Karma Catastrophe (2011) Produced by Scott Spelbring at Dragonfly East Studios in Haymarket, Virginia and Cue Recording Studio in Falls Church, Virginia
 A Light In The Sky (2014)

Extended plays 
Cause and Compromise (2007) Produced by Scott Spelbring at Dragonfly East Studios in Haymarket, Virginia 
The Glass Man EP (2009) Single produced by Jake Dempsey at Red Room Studios in Roanoke, Virginia; Acoustic renditions produced by Dave McDonald at Flat 5 Studios in Salem, Virginia

Singles, Compilations, B-Sides, and Live Albums 
Daybreak (2010) (Single) Produced by Scott Spelbring at Dragonfly East Studios in Haymarket, Virginia
 Peaked at #50 on the Billboard Mainstream Top 200 in August 2010.
5-Year anniversary compilation (2010) Featuring songs from In Time, Cause and Compromise (Matthew Tinsley on Bass Guitar), and The Glass Man EP

References 
 http://rockrevoltmagazine.com/interview-madrone-john-jd-sutphin/

External links 
Band's Official Page 

Rock music groups from Virginia
Musical groups established in 2005

Roanoke, Virginia